The Stars Bowl is a collegiate American football post-season bowl game that is played annually in Mexico between the Mexican All-Star team from CONADEIP and the  American NCAA Division III All-Star team  called Team Stars & Stripes. The 2018 edition was cancelled.

Game results

References

External links
 Scoring Summary 2016

American football in Mexico
2009 establishments in Mexico
Recurring sporting events established in 2009
NCAA Division III